Leif Helge Kongshaug (born 31 July 1949 in Averøy) is a Norwegian politician for the Liberal Party.

He was elected to the Norwegian Parliament from Møre og Romsdal in 1997, but not re-elected in 2001. During the second cabinet Bondevik, Kongshaug was appointed State Secretary in the Ministry of Agriculture and Food. He was re-elected to a second parliamentary term in 2005.

On the local level he was a member of Averøy municipal council from 1979 to 1997, serving as mayor from 1986.
 
Outside politics he has worked as a school teacher, counselor and farmer.

References

1949 births
Living people
People from Averøy
Liberal Party (Norway) politicians
Members of the Storting
Norwegian state secretaries
Mayors of places in Møre og Romsdal
21st-century Norwegian politicians
20th-century Norwegian politicians